Badan Singh (Reign: 1722–21 May 1755) was the formal founder of the princely state of Bharatpur. He was nephew of Rao Churaman Singh. After the Churaman suicide on 22 September 1721 there were family disputes between Badan Singh and Muhkam, son of Churaman. Badan Singh aligned with Jai Singh II of Jaipur to avoid the anger of Muhkam Singh. In this family feud, Jai Singh supported Badan Singh.

Architecture

Badan Singh Yadav had some aesthetic sense and a taste for architecture too, which is testified by the remains of his numerous buildings and garden-palaces. He beautified the fort of Deeg with handsome palaces, which are known as the Purana Mahal.

At Weir in the Bayana district, he planted within the fort a large garden with a beautiful house and reservoirs in the centre, now called Phul-bari.

He also built palaces at Kamar as well Sahar, which are now in ruin, and dedicated a temple at Brindaban, known by the poetic name of Dhir Samir.

Badan Singh lived to a ripe old age, which he spent in happy retirement at Sahar, leaving the management of his State to his most capable son Suraj Mal. He died on the 21 May 1755 under the usual suspicion of being poisoned, though there was no imaginable ground for it.

Muhkam's downfall
Muhkam was forced to retreat from the fort of Thun after being attacked by Jai Singh's army. On 7-8th November 1722 Muhkam fled to Jodhpur, a Mughal army was sent to chase him, however he was saved by the Maharaja of Jodhpur. Badan Singh was thus made the Thakur of Bharatpur by Jai Singh.

References

Rulers of Bharatpur state
1722 births
1755 deaths
18th-century Indian monarchs
Jat